This is a list of the number-one songs of 2017 in Mexico. The airplay chart rankings are published by Monitor Latino, based on airplay across radio stations in Mexico using the Radio Tracking Data, LLC in real time. Charts are ranked from Monday to Sunday. Besides the General chart, Monitor Latino also publishes "Pop", "Popular" (Regional Mexican) and "Anglo" charts.

The streaming charts are published weekly by AMPROFON (Asociación Mexicana de Productores de Fonogramas y Videogramas).

Chart history (Airplay)

General
In 2017, thirteen songs reached number one on the General chart (fifteen if the remix versions of "Despacito" and "Mi gente" are counted as separate songs). Of these, eleven songs were entirely or mostly in Spanish, and two were primarily in English. Nine acts achieved their first number-one song in Mexico: Clean Bandit, Sean Paul, Anne-Marie, Christian Nodal, Willy William, Beyoncé, Nicky Jam, Camila Cabello, Young Thug and Nego do Borel.

"Corazón" by Maluma ft. Nego do Borel was the first No. 1 song to feature Portuguese lyrics since the General chart was founded.

"Despacito" by Luis Fonsi ft. Daddy Yankee was the best performing song of the year.

Pop

Popular

Anglo

Chart history (Streaming)
In 2017, nine songs have reached number one on the Streaming chart; all of these songs were entirely in Spanish.

Venezuelan singer Danny Ocean was the first independent musician to have a number-one song.

See also
List of Top 100 songs for 2017 in Mexico
List of number-one albums of 2017 (Mexico)

References

2017
Number-one songs
Mexico